Ganbulanyi djadjinguli is a fossil species of Miocene dasyurid, described in 1998 and assigned to a new genus. The dentition has characteristics exhibited by mammals known as bone-crackers, a type of durophagy in which the animal is able to obtain to extract food contained in bony material. The amount of fossil material is inadequate to place this taxon within the Dasyuromorph order, but affinities are recognised with the Sarcophilus, the Tasmanian devil, and the extinct species Barinya wangala.

References 

Prehistoric dasyuromorphs
Riversleigh fauna
Mammals described in 1998
Carnivorous marsupials
Prehistoric marsupial genera